The Burggrafenamt is a district in the western part of the Italian province of South Tyrol. It comprises the part of the Adige river valley between Naturns and Bolzano, and its side valleys Passeier Valley and Ulten Valley.

Overview
Originally part of the historic Vinschgau in the west, the name of the region is derived from the burgraves of Tyrol Castle. It is the nucleus of the medieval County of Tyrol with its capital Merano.

According to the 2001 census, 78.66% of the population of the valley speak German, 21.06% Italian and 0.28% Ladin as mother language.

Subdivision

The following municipalities are part of the Burggrafenamt district:

References

External links

Burggrafenamt District 

Districts of South Tyrol